Palmyra Airport  is an airport serving Tadmur (ancient Palmyra), a city in Syria.

History
On 20 May 2015, ISIL captured the airbase. As of 27 March 2016, it was recaptured by the Syrian Army following the 2016 Palmyra offensive only to be recaptured by ISIL 8 months later following the Palmyra offensive (December 2016). In March 2017, it was recaptured by the Syrian Army following the Palmyra offensive (2017).

Facilities

Airlines and destinations
Due to the ongoing Syrian Civil War, there are currently no scheduled flights operated to or from the airport.

References

External links
 

Airports in Syria
Buildings and structures in Homs Governorate